This is a list of St. Anthony’s College alumni, of the St. Anthony’s College, Kandy, Sri Lanka.

| 
| international test cricketer (1992–2010)
| style="text-align:center;" |

References

External links
 Prominent Antonians

Saint Anthony's College, Kandy alumni
Alumni of St. Anthony's College, Kandy